Girls of the Night (French: Filles de nuit, German: Denn keiner ist ohne Sünde) is a 1958 drama film directed by Maurice Cloche and starring Georges Marchal, Nicole Berger and Claus Holm.

It was made as a co-production between France, Italy and West Germany. The film's sets were designed by the art director Robert Giordani.

Cast
 Georges Marchal as Charly  
 Nicole Berger as Néda  
 Claus Holm as Le père Hermann  
 Kai Fischer as Marlène  
 Gil Vidal as Paul  
 Waltraut Haas as Frau Robbé  
 Bum Krüger as Herr Robbé 
 Scilla Gabel as Lola  
 Georges Chamarat as Le Prieur  
 Renato Baldini as Marco  
 Jandeline as Frau Martin, Leiterin der Clairière  
 Ruth Wilbert as Dr. Laban, Ärztin  
 Simone Angèle 
 Jannick Arvel 
 Dominique Davray 
 Jean-Jacques Delbo 
 Marianne Girard 
 Henri-Jacques Huet as Le policier  
 Robert Le Béal 
 Anne-Marie Mersen
 Dominique Page 
 Nicole Riche

References

Bibliography 
 Dayna Oscherwitz & MaryEllen Higgins. The A to Z of French Cinema. Scarecrow Press, 2009.

External links 
 

1958 films
1958 drama films
German drama films
French drama films
Italian drama films
West German films
1950s French-language films
Films directed by Maurice Cloche
Films about prostitution in France
Constantin Film films
1950s French films
1950s Italian films
1950s German films